Ubaldinus Bandinelli (died 1551) was a Roman Catholic prelate who served as Bishop of Corneto e Montefiascone (1548–1551).

Biography
On 4 June 1548, Ubaldinus Bandinelli was appointed during the papacy of Pope Paul III as Bishop of Corneto e Montefiascone.
He served as Bishop of Corneto e Montefiascone until his death in March 1551.

References

External links and additional sources
 (for Chronology of Bishops) 
 (for Chronology of Bishops) 

16th-century Italian Roman Catholic bishops
Bishops appointed by Pope Paul III
1551 deaths